Here is a list of glossary of Culture of India in alphabetical order:

A
Akaal bodhan: worship of Devi Durga in the month of Ashwin.
Akshaya Tritiya: Hindu and Jain, third Tithi (Lunar day) of Bright Half (Shukla Paksha) of Vaishakha. Occasion to buy gold.
Ambubachi Mela: Mela celebrated in Kamakhya Temple in  Guwahati in the assamese month Ahaar (monsoon season). It celebrates the yearly menstruation course of goddess Kamakhya.
Anant Chaturdashi: fourteenth day (Chaturdashi) of the bright fortnight (Shukla paksha) of Bhadrapad month. It is also the last day of the Hindu festival of Ganeshotsav.
Aoling: a festival in Nagaland celebrated by the Konyaks tribes in April
Ayudha Puja: part of the Navratri festival. Weapons and tools are worshipped on this day.

B
Bada Osha: a festival celebrated at the Dhabaleswar temple (of Lord Mahadeva) situated on an island in the river Mahanadi.
Bali Jatra: Celebrated in Cuttack at Gadagadia Ghata of the Mahanadi river, to mark the day when ancient Sadhabas (Odia mariners) would set sail to distant lands of Bali, as well as Java, Sumatra, Borneo (all in Indonesia), and Sri Lanka for trade and cultural expansion. They sailed in large vessels called Boitas.
Bandi Chhor Divas: a Sikh festival which occurs during the month of Ashvin in the Indian lunisolar calendar, around the new moon day (Amavasya). It celebrates the release from prison of the Sixth Guru, Guru Hargobind, and 52 other princes with him, in October 1619.
Bathukamma is a spring festival celebrated by the Hindu women of Telangana region. It is celebrated for nine days during Durga Navratri. On this occasion people make Bathukamma, a beautiful conical flower stack.
Behdeinkhlam: Most important and colourful festival of Jaintias held at Jowai.
 Bhagoria Festival: celebrated by the tribal people (Bhils and Bhilalas) of an Indian state Madhya Pradesh. Amusing tribal festival in which young boys and girls are allowed to elope after choosing their partners.
Bhaonas: a folk theatre in Assam
Bhau-beej: Hindu festival in the second day of the bright fortnight or Shukla Paksha of the Hindu month of Kartika. On this day, sisters pray for their brothers to have long and happy lives by performing the Tika ceremony, and brothers make gifts to their sisters.
Bhumchu: Buddhist festival celebrated to predict the future. In this water stored in a vase is opened during the festival by the lamas who inspect the water level. If it is filled to the brim, the following year will be filled with bloodshed. If it is empty, famine will follow, and if it is half-filled, a prosperous year will follow.
Bihu: celebrated in the state of Assam in India in mid-April. It marks the first day of Hindu Solar calendar. It is a time of celebrations as Spring arrives and there is happiness all around. It also marks the advent of seeding time.
Bishu: a festival in Nagaland celebrated by the Kacharis tribes in January.
Bonalu: a Hindu festival of the Goddess of power, Mahakali. Special poojas are performed for Yellamma on the first and last day of the festival.
Boori-boot: festival celebrated by Hill Miris in Nagaland

C
Chaand Raat Hindi: a Hindi, Urdu locution used in Pakistan and India for the eve of the Muslim festival of Eid ul-Fitr; it can also mean a night with a full moon.
 Chakouba : The biggest festival of Manipur, to strengthen the bond of love between married ladies and their paternal families. 
Chapchar Kut: a festival of Mizoram. Celebrated after the Jhum operation.
Cheraw: A Mizo folk dance performed with bamboo.
Cheti Chand: An important festival celebrated as New Year's Day by Sindhi people of Pakistan and India. According to the Hindu calendar, it is the second day of the month chaitra.
Chhath: An ancient Hindu festival dedicated to the Hindu Sun God, Surya. The Chhath Puja is performed in order to thank Surya for sustaining life on earth and to request the granting of certain wishes.
Cheiraoba: celebrated as New Year's Day in Manipur.
Chotrul Duchen: One of the four Buddhist festivals commemorating four events in the life of the Buddha, according to Tibetan traditions. Chötrul Düchen closely follows Losar, the Tibetan New Year.

D
Danda nata: One of the important dance festivals organized in different parts of South Orissa, particularly in the Ganjam District. Held in the month of Chaitra.
Deva Devali: A Jain festival, which takes place during the month of Kartik around the full moon day (Purnima). This usually falls in October/November. The festival celebrates the enlightenment of Lord Mahavira, the last of the Jain Tirthankar.
Dhanu Jatra: A famous festival celebrated in Bargarh of Koshal region or Western Orissa. It is about the episode of Krishna and Balaram's visit to Mathura to witness the ceremony of 'Bow' organised by their mama Kansa or Kamsa.
Dol Purnima: In Bengal and Orissa, Holi is celebrated as Dol Purnima.
Dree: An agricultural rite observed by the Apatanis in Arunachal Pradesh. It involves the sacrifice of fowls, eggs and animals to the Gods - Tamu, Metii and Danyi Pilo(Sun and Moon God). The purpose of the festival is to appease these Gods so that famine could be avoided.
Drupka Teshi: a Buddhist festival celebrated to observe Buddha's first preaching of the "Noble Truths" at the deer park in Sarnath.
Durga Puja: An annual Hindu festival in South Asia that celebrates worship of the Hindu goddess Durga. It refers to all the six days observed as Mahalaya, Shashthi, Maha Saptami, Maha Ashtami, Maha Navami and Vijayadashami.
Dussehara: A ten-day festival celebrated in September or October by the northern states of India to mark the victory of Lord Ram over the evil demon-king Ravana. Ramlila, which is the re-enactment of the Ramayana, is staged in various cities, towns and villages. On the tenth day of the festival, the effigies of Ravana, his brother Kumbhakaran and son Meghnath are burned to portray the triumph of good over evil.

E
Ekadashi: The eleventh lunar day (Tithi) of the shukla (bright) or krishna (dark) paksha (fortnight) of every lunar month in the Hindu calendar (Panchang). In Hinduism and Jainism it is considered a spiritually beneficial day.
 Emoinu Iratpa: The festival of lights celebrated in Manipur, dedicated to Manipuri Goddess Emoinu, the goddess of Wealth and Prosperity.

G
Gaan Ngai: A festival of the Zeliangrong Nagas in Assam, Manipur and Nagaland.
Ganesh Chaturthi: Hindu festival celebrated on the rebirth of Lord Ganesha, the son of Shiva and Parvati.
Ganesh Jayanti:  Hindu festival celebrated on the birth day of Ganesha.
Gangaur: a festival in Rajasthan, celebrated in the honour of Goddess Gauri.
Gudhi Padwa: the Marathi name for Chaitra Shukla Pratipada. It is celebrated on the first day of the Chaitra month to mark the beginning of the New year.
Guru Nanak Gurpurab: One of the most sacred festivals in Sikhism, Guru Nanak Dev Ji's Prakash Utsav, marks the birth anniversary of the first Sikh Guru, Guru Nanak.
Guru Purnima: a festival traditionally celebrated by Hindus and Buddhists, marked by ritualistic veneration of the Guru, Guru Puja.

H
Haldi Kumkum: a social gathering (popular in Maharashtra, Gujarat, Rajasthan and Goa) in which married women exchange haldi (turmeric) and kumkum (vermilion powder), as a symbol of their married status and wishing for their husbands' long lives.
Hanuman Jayanti: celebrated to commemorate the birth of Hanuman, the Vanara god, widely venerated throughout India on the 15th day of the Shukla Paksha, during the month of Chaitra.
 Heeyang Taanaba: The boat racing religious sports of Manipur. 
 Heikru Hidongba: The boat racing religious festival of Manipur, celebrated by the followers of Sanamahism. 
Hornbill Festival: Festival of Festivals' of Naga Tribes, celebrated in Nagaland in the first week of December.

K
Kali Puja: dedicated to the Hindu goddess Kali, celebrated on the new moon day of the Hindu month Ashwin in Bengal.
Kanya puja: a Hindu holiday celebrated on the eighth and ninth day of Navaratri. Nine young girls representing the nine forms of Goddess Durga are worshiped
Kartik Poornima: a Hindu holy day celebrated on the full moon day or the fifteenth lunar day of Kartik.
Karva Chauth: on this day Hindu and some Sikh women in North India fast from sunrise to moonrise for the safety and longevity of their husbands.
Krishna Janmashtami: annual commemoration of the birth of Krishna, the eighth avatar of Vishnu.
Kshamavani: a day of forgiving and seeking forgiveness for the followers of Jainism.
Kumbh Mela: a mass Hindu pilgrimage in which Hindus gather at the Ganges, where bathing for purification from sin is considered especially efficacious. It takes place every twelve years at Allahabad

L
Lai Haraoba: a Manipuri festival, and is associated with Meiteis, celebrated to please traditional deities.
Lakshmi puja: a Hindu ritual performed during Diwali, the festival of lights. According to tradition people would put small oil lamps outside their homes on Diwali and hope Lakshmi will come to bless them.
Lhabab Duchen: one of the four Buddhist festivals commemorating four events in the life of the Buddha, according to Tibetan traditions.
Lohri: an extremely popular festival celebrated by the Punjabis. This agricultural winter festival is celebrated throughout Punjab and in parts of Haryana, Himachal Pradesh, Delhi and Jammu.
Losar: festival celebrated by Monpas in Nagaland
Lui-Ngai-Ni: A Naga seed sowing festival in spring in Manipur.

M
Magh Bihu: a harvest festival celebrated in Assam, India, which marks the end of harvesting season in the month of Maagha
Maha Shivratri: a Hindu festival celebrated every year in reverence of Lord Shiva.
Mahavir Jayanti: the most important religious holiday in Jainism. It celebrates the birth of Mahavira, the last Tirthankara.
Makar Sankranti: marks the transition of the Sun into Makara rashi (Capricorn) on its celestial path. Traditionally, this has been one of many harvest days in India.
Makara Jyothi: worshiped as a part of ritual in Sabarimala Temple on Makara Sankranti every year. Devout Hindus believe that the jyothi is a celestial phenomenon and its sighting is auspicious and brings good luck and blessings.
Mattu Pongal: Celebration of the cattle, particularly cows and bulls that play a vital role by working hard to help the farmers to raise crops on their fields on the day following the Pongal festival.
Mera Houchongba: A traditional festival celebrating the bond between the hills and the valley people of Manipur. It is held in October.
Mim Kut: a festival in Mizoram celebrated by the Mizos in September
Moatsu: a festival in Nagaland celebrated by the Aos in the first week of May.
Mongmong: a festival in Nagaland celebrated by the Sangtams in September
Mopin: festival of the Adis, mainly of the Gallong community of the Arunachal Pradesh. It is a celebration of the harvesting season.
Muharram: is the first month of the Islamic calendar. It is one of the four sacred months of the year in which fighting is prohibited.

N
Nag Panchami: also Nagula Chaviti, is a festival during which religious Hindus in some parts of India worship live Nāgas (cobras) or images of them. It is celebrated on the fifth day after Amavasya of the month of Shraavana.
Navratri: means nine nights, a festival dedicated to the worship of a Hindu deity Shakti.
Navreh: the lunar new year which is celebrated in Kashmir. This coincides with the first day of the Chaitra (spring) Navratras. This day finds mention in Rajtarangini and Nilamat Purana of Kashmir.
Ningol Chakouba: a festival in Manipur which involves the married women going to their parent's house.
Nongkrem dance: A five-day-long religious festival of Khasis held at Smit village.
Nuakhai: An agricultural festival mainly observed by people of western Orissa in India. It is observed to welcome the new rice of the season.
Nyokum: a festival celebrated by the Nyishi people of Arunachal Pradesh.
Nyaknylum: a festival in Nagaland celebrated by the Changs in July

P
 Panthoibi Iratpa : The greatest religious festival dedicated to Manipuri Goddess Panthoibi, celebrated in Manipur, Assam and Tripura.
Pattachitra: a form of traditional painting in Orissa.
Pawl Kut: a harvest festival of Mizoram.
Raja Parba: also called Mithuna Sankranti is a four-day-long festival in Orissa and the second day signifies beginning of the solar month of Mithuna from, which the season of rains starts.
Reh: festival celebrated by Idu-Mishmis in Nagaland
Paryushana: one of the two most important festivals for the Jains, the other being Diwali.
Pitru Paksha: a 16–lunar day period when Hindus pay homage to their ancestors (Pitrs), especially through food offerings.
Pola: a bull-worshipping festival celebrated by farmers in Maharashtra.
Puthandu: also called Chithirai Tiru-naal, is the celebration of the first day of the Tamil new year in mid-April.

R
Radhashtami : Annual Hindu festival celebrating the birth anniversary of Goddess Radha. 
Raksha Bandhan: celebrates the relationship between brothers, cousins and sisters. The central ceremony involves the tying of a rakhi (sacred thread) by a sister on her brother's wrist.
Ram Navami: Hindu festival, celebrating the birth of Lord Rama to King Dasharatha and Queen Kausalya of Ayodhya.
Ratha Saptami: a Hindu festival that falls on the seventh day (Saptami) in the bright half (Shukla Paksha) of the Hindu month Maagha. It is symbolic of the change of season to spring and the start of the harvesting season.
Ratha Yatra: a huge Hindu festival associated with Lord Jagannath held at Puri in the state of Orissa, India.

S
Sammakka Saralamma Jatara: a tribal festival of honouring the goddesses celebrated in the Telangana region of Andhra Pradesh. The Jatra starts from Medaram.
Samvatsari: the last day of Paryushana —the eight or ten day festival of Jainism. It is the holiest day of the Jain calendar.
Sanamahism: The worship of Sanamahi, the Creator aspect of Sidaba Mapu, the trinity God of the Meitei people. One of the oldest sects of South Asia. It originated in Manipur, India and is mainly practiced by the Meitei, Kabui, Zeliangrong and other communities. Atiya Shidaba, Apanba and Asheeba are the three manifestations or incarnations of God as the creator, the preserver and the annihilator of this universe respectively.
 Sangai festival: The festival of Manipur, to promote the tourism potential and cultural heritage of the state. 
Sanjhi: the art of hand cutting (or stencil cutting) designs on paper, is typical art of Mathura in Uttar Pradesh.
Sanjhi puja: mainly celebrated by the unmarried girls in rural Punjab and Haryana in the month of October. An image of Mother Goddess is made of mud or dung and worshipped.
Sekrenyi: a festival in Nagaland celebrated by the Angamis in February.
Shad Sukmynsiem: festival of Khasi held in April.
Shigmo: a Hindu spring festival celebrated in the Indian state of Goa.
 Shirui Lily Festival: The festival of Manipur, to promote the beauty of Siroy Lily, in Sirohi National Park. 
Si-Donyi: festival celebrated by Tagins in Arunachal Pradesh
Solung: festival celebrated by Adi tribals in Arunachal Pradesh

T
Teej: a fasting festival for Hindu women. It is mainly celebrated in Haryana and Bihar.
Tendong Lho Rumfaat: means Prayer of the Tendong Mountain, is a festival of the Lepcha people of north-east India.
Thai Pongal: celebrated by Tamilians. Coincides with Makara Sankranthi celebrated throughout India as the winter harvest.
Tokhu Emong: a festival in Nagaland celebrated by the Lothas in November. This festival is associated with the harvesting of crops.
Tsukhenyie: a festival in Nagaland celebrated by the Chakhesangs in January.
Tuluni: a festival in Nagaland celebrated by the Sumis in July.

U
Ugadi: the New Year's Day for the people of Andhra Pradesh and Karnataka.
 Umang Lai Haraoba: The Religious dance and music festival dedicated to the forest deities of Manipur, Assam and Tripura, performed by the followers of Sanamahism. 
Uposatha: the Buddhist day of observance. The Buddha taught that the Uposatha day is for "the cleansing of the defiled mind," resulting in inner calm and joy.

V
Vasant Panchami: a Hindu festival worshipping Saraswati, the goddess of knowledge, music and art. It is celebrated every year on the fifth day of Magh.
Vesak: a holy day observed traditionally by Buddhists.

W
Wangala: a harvest festival celebrated by the Garo tribe, who live in Meghalaya and Assam in honour of Saljong (Sungod).

Y
Yaosang: a festival celebrated in spring season starting from the full moon day of lamda (March) for six whole days by the people of Manipur. Thabal chongba is performed. People play with colours.
Yemshe: a festival in Nagaland celebrated by the Pochuris in October.

Z
Zagor: mainly celebrated by Catholics in Siolim, in Bardez taluka of Goa. It is a festival highlighted by dance, drama and music.

See also
 Public holidays in India
 List of Indian folk dances
 Indian literature

References

Indian Culture
Indian culture-related lists
Wikipedia glossaries using unordered lists